All or Nothing is the second studio album by Ukrainian recording artist Jamala. It was released on 19 March 2013 in Ukraine through Moon Records Ukraine. On April 26, 2013 the album was released on vinyl. The album includes the singles "Я Люблю Тебя", "Hurt" and "Кактус".

Singles
"Я Люблю Тебя" was released as the lead single from the album on 8 November 2012. "Hurt" was released as the second single from the album on 18 December 2012. "Кактус" was released as the third single from the album on 6 March 2013.

Track listing

Release history

References

External links
 Official website
 album All or Nothing

Jamala albums
2013 albums